Janice Doreen Dickinson (born February 16, 1955) is an American model, television personality, and businesswoman. Initially notable as a model, Dickinson has been disputably described by herself as the first supermodel. One of the most successful models of the 1970s and 1980s, she also served as a judge on four cycles of America's Next Top Model (2003–2006). Dickinson opened a modeling agency in 2005 which was documented on the reality series The Janice Dickinson Modeling Agency (2006–2008).

In 2007, Dickinson was a contestant on the seventh series of I'm a Celebrity...Get Me Out of Here! in which she finished as runner-up. In 2008, she starred on the reality series Janice & Abbey, alongside British model Abbey Clancy. In 2010, Dickinson appeared on the fourth series of Celebrity Rehab with Dr. Drew, and in 2015, she appeared on Celebrity Big Brother 16, where she placed 7th.

Dickinson has released three autobiographical books: No Lifeguard on Duty (2002), Everything About Me Is Fake… And I'm Perfect (2004), and Check Please! Dating, Mating, and Extricating (2006).

Early life 
Dickinson was born in Brooklyn, New York, the second daughter to Jennie Marie (née Pietrzykowski) and Ray Dickinson. Her mother was of Polish descent.

She was raised in Hollywood, Florida with her elder sister, Alexis, who became a real estate agent, and her younger sister, Debbie, who also became a model.

Dickinson has been open about the emotional and physical abuse she suffered as a child and teenager, and how her father used to sexually abuse one of her sisters. Of her childhood with her "rageoholic pedophile" of a father, Dickinson stated, "Because I wouldn't give in and let him have sex with me, I was verbally and physically abused on a daily basis. I was told that I looked like a boy and wouldn't amount to anything."

Modeling career 
In the early 1970s, Dickinson moved to New York City to pursue work as a model after winning a national competition called "Miss High Fashion Model." At a time when blue-eyed blondes dominated the fashion scene, Dickinson was turned down several times by modeling agents, including Eileen Ford, who informed Dickinson she was "much too ethnic. You'll never work."

She was discovered by the fashion photographer Jacques Silberstein when his girlfriend, actress Lorraine Bracco, mentioned she liked Dickinson's look. Wilhelmina Cooper became Dickinson's first agent. Her modeling pursuits led her to Paris, France, where her "exotic looks" secured her reputation within the European fashion industry.

She returned to New York City in 1978, and spent the next several years working steadily, earning $2,000 per day, nearly four times the standard rate. Dickinson eventually signed with Ford Models to land a major ad campaign for a new JVC camera. Dickinson, who had not forgotten Ford's initial rejection, was intent on revenge. She soon became one of twenty Ford models to defect to John Casablancas's upstart Elite Model Management.

By the 1980s, Dickinson was considered a supermodel, as she "possessed the kind of name and face recognition" that the majority of women in the modeling industry strive to achieve. She appeared within and on covers of magazines including Harper's Bazaar, Cosmopolitan, Photo, Vogue, Marie Claire, and Playboy, and worked with some of fashion's best-known names, including Bill Blass, Gianni Versace, Valentino Garavani, Azzedine Alaïa, Pino Lancetti, Halston, Oscar de la Renta and Calvin Klein. She has appeared on the cover of Vogue  (International editions only) 37 times. She was seen on the cover of Elle seven times in a row and has been the face of ad campaigns for brands including Revlon, Alberto VO5, Balmain, Obao, Christian Dior, Clairol, Hush Puppies, Orbit gum, Max Factor, Virginia Slims, and Cutex.

Dickinson looked for ways to sustain her relevance within the fashion industry as she aged, becoming a fashion photographer. In 2008, she launched her own jewelry line on HSN.

In 2009, Dickinson recorded a song entitled "Crazy", which was written and produced by Craig Taylor.

"First supermodel" claim 

While Dickinson claims to have coined the term supermodel in 1979, and to be the first "supermodel", the word already was known in the 1940s. The writer Judith Cass used the term in 1942 in her Chicago Tribune article "Super Models are Signed for Fashion Show". In 1943, author Clyde Matthew Dessner used the term in his book So You Want to Be a Model!

The New York Times, on March 21, 1967, and The Daily Times of Salisbury, Maryland on May 19, 1967, both referred to Twiggy as a supermodel.

In 1968, an article in Glamour described Twiggy, Cheryl Tiegs, Wilhelmina, Veruschka, Jean Shrimpton, and 15 other models as "supermodels".

Syndicated columnist Suzy Knickerbocker in 1970 described Penelope Tree as a supermodel.

The April 23, 1971, issue of The Hour headlined one of its articles "Supermodels Reveal Their Beauty Secrets", including an advertisement with the caption "Supermodel Cheryl Tiegs". The article also says, "The fashion/beauty world is dotted with Supermodels" and "Cybill Shepherd a Supermodel who may turn into a Superstar." Jean Shrimpton was described as a supermodel by Time in 1971, as were Margaux Hemingway by Vogue on September 1, 1975, Beverly Johnson by Jet in 1977, and Naomi Sims in the 1978 book Total Beauty Catalog by K.T. Maclay.

Lisa Fonssagrives and Dorian Leigh, whose careers began before Dickinson was born, have been retroactively recognized as the 20th century's first supermodels. Gia Carangi has been called the first supermodel as well as Jean Shrimpton.
Lauren Hutton has also been referred to as the first supermodel, due to the fact that she was the first model to get a cosmetics contract. (In 1974 with Revlon.)

Television career 
In 2003, Dickinson returned to media attention with her stint as a judge on the reality television series America's Next Top Model. She was hired after producer Tyra Banks read No Lifeguard On Duty and realized that Dickinson could offer the contestants advice on the perils of the fashion industry. As a panelist, Dickinson became known for her wit and incisive, brutally honest critiques.

Dickinson frequently quarreled with her fellow judges, particularly Kimora Lee Simmons and Nolé Marin. A recurring source of tension between Dickinson and Banks was the former's dubiety concerning plus-size models.

After four cycles, Banks fired Dickinson, replacing her with Twiggy. Dickinson was hurt by the decision. "I was just telling the truth and I was saving these girls from going out there and being told that they're too short, too fat, their skin's not good enough," she said. "I was to America's Next Top Model what Simon Cowell is to American Idol." Despite this, Dickinson made guest appearances on the following three cycles: As the photographer for a photo challenge in cycle 5, in a mentor role in cycle 6, and as the interviewee for an interview challenge in cycle 7. In 2005, Dickinson was a cast member on The Surreal Life during its fifth season. She was confronted by castmate Omarosa Manigault during a publicity photo shoot while Dickinson was posing with a prop knife. After being physically separated by Bronson Pinchot the two continued to feud throughout the series.

In 2006, Dickinson starred in her own reality show, The Janice Dickinson Modeling Agency, for the Oxygen cable-television channel. The program, which ran for four seasons, documented Dickinson launching a new career as a modeling agent. She appeared with British model Abigail Clancy in Beauty & The Best, a reality series detailing Clancy's attempt to break into the American modeling market. The show debuted in the United Kingdom on Living on May 14, 2007, and premiered in the U.S on Oxygen on February 19, 2008.

In November 2007, Dickinson became one of the celebrities taking part in the British reality television show I'm a Celebrity…Get Me out of Here!. She set the record for most Bushtucker trials, competing ten times in a row. In the finale of the series, it was announced that Dickinson had gained second place in the competition, with Christopher Biggins coming first.

Dickinson was also a contestant for season two of the American version of I'm a Celebrity... Get Me Out of Here! which began airing in June 2009. She was eliminated from the show on June 18, 2009.

In 2009, Dickinson was a guest judge on the Finnish version of the Top Model franchise. She created controversy after the claimed effects of accidentally mixing a sleeping aid with champagne caused her to fall down a flight of stairs and burst out at the models. Dickinson was taken to a hospital where she was told she had no visible injuries. She later apologized to the models during the show's airing.

Other guest appearances include "Still Charmed and Kicking", an episode of Charmed. Dickinson made a cameo appearance in Darren Hayes's music video "On the Verge of Something Wonderful". In 2010, Dickinson appeared on the celebrity edition of British dinner-party contest Come Dine with Me, on which she frequently butted heads with former Page 3 Girl Samantha Fox over her glamour modeling career, and flirted with Calum Best.

Dickinson appeared in the fourth season of Celebrity Rehab with Dr. Drew, which premiered in December 2010. In 2011, she guest-starred in an episode of 90210 (titled "Project Runway").

In August 2015, Dickinson was a housemate on the sixteenth season of the British reality show, Celebrity Big Brother. She became the seventh celebrity to be evicted from the house, just two days before the final.

In 2020, Dickinson appeared on season 24 of The Bachelor.

Personal life 
Dickinson has been married four times. Her former husbands are Ron Levy, Simon Fields, and Alan B. Gersten, also known as Albert Gersten. She has a son, Nathan, and a daughter, Savannah. Dickinson was having an affair with Sylvester Stallone when Savannah was born in 1994, and it was reported that Stallone was the father. Their relationship ended when DNA tests proved he was not the father. In her books and in interviews, she has discussed her numerous sexual relationships with male and female celebrities. In 2012, she announced she was engaged to Dr. Robert Gerner ("Rocky"), a psychiatrist whom she married in December 2016.

In November 2014, Dickinson joined a number of women accusing comedian Bill Cosby of rape, alleging that Cosby raped her in 1982. Dickinson said that she tried to write about this in her 2002 autobiography, but Cosby and his lawyers pressured her and her lawyers to remove the details.

In March 2016, it was revealed that Dickinson had been diagnosed with breast cancer.

Books 
Dickinson released a memoir detailing her "wild days" as a supermodel. Titled No Lifeguard on Duty: The Accidental Life of the World's First Supermodel (2002), the book was effective in introducing her to a new generation. Her 2004 follow-up memoir was Everything About Me Is Fake… And I'm Perfect, in which she describes her life in modeling; her experience with plastic surgery; and her battles with anorexia, bulimia, and alcoholism. Her next memoir, Check Please! Dating, Mating, and Extricating (2006), discusses the men in her life, and prescribes her rules for dating.

Bibliography 
Dickinson, Janice (2002). No Lifeguard on DutyThe Accidental Life of the World's First Supermodel. New York City: ReganBooks;

Filmography

See also 

List of people from Florida
List of people from Brooklyn, New York
List of women writers
 List of people in Playboy 1980–1989

References

External links 

Living people
1955 births
20th-century American actresses
20th-century American women writers
20th-century American non-fiction writers
21st-century American actresses
21st-century American women writers
Actresses from Florida
Actresses from New York City
American photographers
American fashion businesspeople
American women in business
American female models
American memoirists
American people of Polish descent
American talent agents

Fashion photographers
People from Hollywood, Florida
The Janice Dickinson Modeling Agency
Female models from New York (state)
Female models from Florida
Dickinson, Janice
American women memoirists
Writers from Brooklyn
Writers from Florida
Models from New York City
21st-century American non-fiction writers
I'm a Celebrity...Get Me Out of Here! (British TV series) participants
21st-century American women photographers
21st-century American photographers